The 2018–19 Montana State Bobcats women's basketball team represents Montana State University during the 2018–19 NCAA Division I women's basketball season. The Bobcats, led by thirteenth year head coach Tricia Binford, play their home games at Brick Breeden Fieldhouse and were members of the Big Sky Conference. They finished the season 16–15, 11–9 in Big Sky play to finish in fifth place. They lost in the quarterfinals of the Big Sky women's tournament to Portland State.

Roster

Schedule

|-
!colspan=9 style=| Exhibition

|-
!colspan=9 style=| Non-conference regular season

|-
!colspan=9 style=| Big Sky regular season

|-
!colspan=9 style=| Big Sky Women's Tournament

See also
2018–19 Montana State Bobcats men's basketball team

References

Montana State Bobcats women's basketball seasons
Montana State